The 1994 Hawaii gubernatorial election was held on November 3, 1994. Incumbent Democratic Governor of Hawaii John D. Waihee III was prevented from seeking a third term as Governor due to term limits, creating an open seat. Lieutenant Governor Ben Cayetano emerged from a crowded primary to become the Democratic nominee, facing off against former Administrator of the Small Business Administration Pat Saiki, the Republican nominee and Honolulu Mayor Frank Fasi, who ran as the Best Party of Hawaii's nominee. In a very close election, Cayetano beat Fasi, who placed second, by six percentage points and Saiki, who placed third, winning only a plurality of the vote. Fasi's performance was notable in that it was the best performance by a third party gubernatorial candidate in Hawaii's history.

Democratic primary

Candidates
Ben Cayetano, Lieutenant Governor of Hawaii
John C. Lewin, Hawaii Director of Health
Bu La'ia
George Nitta, Jr., radio personality
Anthony N. Hodges, perennial candidate
Al Canopin, Jr.
Elbert Marshall

Results

Republican primary

Candidates
Pat Saiki, former Administrator of the Small Business Administration, former Congresswoman, 1990 Republican nominee for the United States Senate
Stuart Todd Gregory
Charles Y. Hirayasu
Robert Measel, Jr.

Results

General election

Results

References

1994
Gubernatorial
1994 United States gubernatorial elections